Mundo Autista is a Brazilian YouTube channel hosted by Selma Sueli Silva and Sophia Mendonça. This channel addresses issues related to nuances that are usually little explored in the Autism Spectrum, mainly in adults and women. Mundo Autista is the oldest channel in activity on Brazilian YouTube and won several accolades.

Format 
The essence of the Mundo Autista is to share the experiences of the presenters, in order to ease the suffering of other autistic people and their families. Thus, the episodes range from prejudice to issues such as diversity of gender, race and religion. The channel is based on the idea that knowing how to live together presupposes learning to debate conflicting situations, as it is from the conflict that we mature, grow and, finally, develop. On the show, Silva and Mendonça talk about autism with good humor and respect, in addition to other contemporary topics. The episodes also address issues such as anxiety attacks and discuss issues such as legislation.

The channel was created with a focus on disseminating information about ASD, with the slogan 'Welcome to this fascinating world of autism'. In this way, the co-hosts aim to bring people together, inside and outside the spectrum, humanizing debates on the subject. Mundo Autista's agenda is diversity in the autistic spectrum. The show brings to the discussion aspects such as class, age, gender identity and sexual orientation. In addition, controversial topics such as affectivity and love relationships are also part of the debate. The themes of the channel deviate from what is common in the production of content in the autism community in Brazil, which has a greater focus on children and men.

Production 

Mundo Autista's concept emerged in 2015, after a conversation between Mendonça, then a journalism student, and her mother, a veteran radio personality.  The channel project came about because both considered themselves alone and were looking for other families who could talk about autism. Nowadays, the channel aims to expand the work of bringing information and inclusion to society, in addition to interacting with followers throughout Brazil.  The channel had its debut in 2015 with the title Mundo Asperger and was renamed Mundo Autista in 2020. At the time of launch, it was the second YouTube channel featuring autistic people to receive acclaim from the audience, after the canceled Nelson Marra, which ran between 2015 and 2016. From 2019 to 2020, Mundo Autista established partnerships with other media outlets, such as Diários Associados, Revista Autismo and the podcast Introvertendo. 

The co-hosts Selma Sueli Silva and Sophia Mendonça are journalists, in addition to being mother and daughter. Mundo Autista is the oldest autistic channel still active on Brazilian YouTube, with videos published since 2015. In addition to video production, Mundo Autista also has content in text and podcast. Selma and Sophia are also writers, with several books published. For Mendonça, both she and Silva have already suffered persecution on the Internet because of the channel, which, according to her, was horrible and left sequels. Therefore, the co-host has chosen to develop a more discreet profile, without highlighting offensive comments, although she remains unafraid to delve into controversial issues, if necessary. She reports some of these challenging situations in the book Metamorfoses, the result of her academic thesis.

Cast 
In addition to Silva and Mendonça, who moderate the episodes, Mundo Autista presented several co-hosts for specific frames. In 2019, the channel debuted the Neurodivergentes & Aprendizagem series, with author and professor Ângela Mathylde Soares, about learning. The following year, Sophia Mendonça co-hosted the series De Brincadeira, with author and researcher on art and education Raquel Romano, and Na Real, alongside psychologist Ana Pascotto. Still in 2020, Selma Sueli Silva teamed up with journalist Camila Marques to talk about topics such as racism in the series As Divergentes, and starred in her own talk-show within the channel, entitled Programa Selma Sueli Silva. That same year, Mundo Autista had the co-hosting of public defender Luis Renato Arêas, whose participation dealt with legal matters. The channel has also received several guests throughout its history, such as politician Andréa Werner, psychiatrists Kelly Robis and Raquel Del Monde, researchers Jeane Mendes and Daniela Gonçalves, psychologists Lucas Géo and Lídia Prata, occupational therapists Ellis Drezza and Daniela Gonçalves, neuropsychologist and professor Annelise-Julio Costa, children's writer Andrea Taubman and neuropediatrician Liubiana Araújo, from Harvard University. It also featured interviews with other autistic people, such as cartoonist Rodrigo Tramonte and therapist Myriam Letícia. In addition, Mundo Autista brought reports from close relatives of the co-hosts. Thus, some of her most watched episodes were with Silva's mother and former husband, respectively Irene Silva and Roberto Mendonça. The episode The Rights of the Autistic Person, which featured an interview with lawyer Antônio Claret, is the channel's most watched.

Reception 
In March 2023, Mundo Autista had around 70.000 subscribers and 2.5 million views.  The channel is constantly mentioned in lists of content about autism in Brazil and cited as a reference by autistic digital influencers.

In 2019, the channel won a motion from the Brazilian city of Divinópolis and was one of the winners of the business communication contest promoted by Diários Associados. In 2023, it was one of the winners of the fifth influencers award promoted by the Center for Communication Studies and the Business Communication Platform, by popular and technical votes.

Spin-offs 
In 2022, the channel launched the Mundo Autista D&I podcast, which debuted at #54 on Apple Podcasts. In addition, the channel produced several documentaries, such as Vozes da Maturidade and TransParente.

References

YouTube channels
Works about autism